Heartbreak Boulevard is the seventh music album released by German singer Mark Ashley, in association with Systems in Blue. It features the song "Give a Little Sweet Love".

Track listing 
 "Operation Love" - 03:10
 "Back To The Summer '97" - 03:26
 "Gimme Gimme Money" - 03:45
 "Cinderella's Heart" - 04:37
 "Marilyn's Dream" - 03:42
 "Lonely Nights In Avalon" - 03:35
 "Do You Remember" - 03:33
 "King Of Roses" - 04:12
 "Heartbreak Boulevard" - 03:55
 "High In The Sky" - 03:26
 "In The Name Of Love" - 03:20
 "Magical Moon" - 03:45
 "You Kill Me With Your Smile" - 03:37
 "Never Say Never" - 03:28
 "Give a Little Sweet Love" - 03:51

References 

2008 albums
Mark Ashley (musician) albums
Universal Records albums